Pável Uriel Pérez Hernández (born 26 June 1998) is a Mexican professional footballer who plays as a midfielder for Liga MX club Guadalajara.

Career statistics

Club

Honours
Tepatitlán
Liga de Expansión MX: Guardianes 2021
Campeón de Campeones: 2021

References

External links

 
 

1998 births
Living people
Association football midfielders
Liga de Expansión MX players
Liga MX players
Tercera División players
C.D. Guadalajara footballers
C.D. Tepatitlán de Morelos players
CD Toledo players
Footballers from Jalisco
People from Tala, Jalisco
Mexican footballers